The 2004–05 Maltese First Division (known as the MIA First Division for sponsorship reasons) started on 5 September 2004 and finished on 15 May 2005.

Ħamrun Spartans were promoted back to the Premier League after just one season away, following their relegation alongside Balzan Youths in the 2003–04 Premier League season. Mosta joined Ħamrun in securing place in the Premier League. Balzan suffered a consecutive relegation, and alongside Gozo were relegated to the 2005–06 Second Division.

Changes from previous season

Team changes

From Second Division
Promoted to Premier League
 St. Patrick
 Lija Athletic

Relegated to Second Division
 Tarxien Rainbows
 Rabat Ajax

To First Division 
Relegated from Premier League
 Balzan Youths
 Ħamrun Spartans

Promoted from Second Division
 St. George's
 Gozo

Teams

League table

Results

Top scorers

References

Maltese First Division seasons
Malta
2